Hakha District is the third district of the Chin State, Union of Myanmar. It was formed in the first Chin State Hluttaw emergency meeting No. 2/2012 on 1 June 2012. 
It consists of 
Hakha Township and
Thantlang Township.

References

States and territories established in 2012
Districts of Myanmar
Chin State